The Wizarding World of Harry Potter is a themed area spanning two theme parks—Islands of Adventure and Universal Studios Florida—at the Universal Orlando Resort in Orlando, Florida. The area is themed to the Harry Potter media franchise, adapting elements from the film series and novels by J. K. Rowling. The Wizarding World of Harry Potter was designed by Universal Creative from an exclusive license with Warner Bros. Entertainment.

The first phase was officially announced for Islands of Adventure on May 31, 2007, and after a two-and-a-half-year construction period, the area officially opened to the public on June 18, 2010. The area's flagship ride is Harry Potter and the Forbidden Journey, which exists within a re-creation of Hogwarts School of Witchcraft and Wizardry. It takes riders on a journey through Harry Potter's wizarding world. The Wizarding World of Harry Potter also contains Flight of the Hippogriff, a family roller coaster, and formerly included Dragon Challenge, a pair of inverted roller coasters, which was replaced in 2019 by a new roller coaster, Hagrid's Magical Creatures Motorbike Adventure. The area also features a re-creation of Hogsmeade containing many gift shops and restaurants from the novels including Dervish and Banges, Honeydukes, Ollivanders, Zonko's Joke Shop (though it houses Honeydukes), the Three Broomsticks, and the Hog's Head.

The second phase was initially announced on December 6, 2011, as a significant expansion of the existing Wizarding World of Harry Potter. On May 8, 2013, it was officially announced that a substantial portion of phase two would be constructed in the adjacent Universal Studios Florida theme park with a full scale working replica of the Hogwarts Express taking guests between the two lands. This phase's flagship ride is Harry Potter and the Escape from Gringotts, a 3D dark ride/simulator based on Gringotts Bank, the wizarding bank that appears in the book and film series. Its design is similar to Transformers: The Ride and the Amazing Adventures of Spider-Man rides but built on a roller coaster track. The remaining features are themed around London and Diagon Alley. Diagon Alley officially opened on July 8, 2014.

Background

Previous attempts
Rumors of a Harry Potter-themed area at a Universal Studios park or a Disney park started to circulate in 2003. However, the rights to the Harry Potter franchise had been acquired by Warner Bros., who denied all the rumors. In 2001, Time Warner used this license to construct and operate the Harry Potter Movie Magic Experience at Warner Bros. Movie World on the Gold Coast, Australia; it was a small indoor walkthrough featuring many re-creations of locations in the first two movies. After two years of operation, it was removed.

The Walt Disney Company and Universal entered bidding negotiations with Warner Bros. and Rowling for the theme park rights to Harry Potter in the United States. In 2004, Rowling signed a letter-of-intent with Disney, with the company intending to develop a Harry Potter section in a corner of Fantasyland, within the Magic Kingdom park at Walt Disney World. Ultimately, Disney pulled out of negotiations, citing that Rowling's creative influence and the terms established by Warner Bros. were too stringent.

Rumors and official announcement
In January 2007, About.com reported a rumor from a "highly credible source" that the Lost Continent area within Universal's Islands of Adventure park was to be re-themed "to the stories and characters of one of the most popular children's franchises". Other sources followed up in the next few days with unofficial confirmation the new area would involve Harry Potter, and was being developed under the name "Project Strong Arm" in reference to the KUKA robotic arm technology it would utilise. Nikki Finke reported her own confirmation of the Potter park plans in April, followed shortly by a story in The Scotsman; both reports were widely relayed by other media sources. On May 31, 2007, Universal (in partnership with Warner Bros.) officially announced the  addition recreating Hogwarts, the Forbidden Forest and Hogsmeade, with a planned opening in 2009.

Phase 1: Islands of Adventure

Construction of the Wizarding World of Harry Potter began seven months after the official announcement, in January 2008. By July, the Flying Unicorn and Enchanted Oak Tavern were closed. The Flying Unicorn then began an almost two-year refurbishment which transformed it into the Flight of the Hippogriff. The Enchanted Oak Tavern was later demolished. A bridge was built to connect The Lost Continent with Jurassic Park allowing guests to avoid the construction zone that was to become the Wizarding World. Construction progressed with the Hogwarts Castle slowly taking shape. By September 2008, the Dueling Dragons entrance was moved to Jurassic Park to make room for construction of Hogsmeade. One month later, the old entrance was demolished. By September 2009, the top shell of Hogwarts Castle was completed. On September 15, an announcement was made detailing what was going to be included in the Wizarding World. In early 2010, Universal increased its marketing of the area, which included newspaper advertisements, billboards and television commercials. The Dueling Dragons were closed for some maintenance before being transformed into the Dragon Challenge. Construction was completed by June 1, 2010, when the area began soft openings.

A soft opening weekend was held for the media and reserved guests, starting on May 28, 2010. The park had two opening ceremonies that took place on June 16 and on June 18, 2010. The Wizarding World of Harry Potter's grand opening ceremony took place on June 16 with book series author J. K. Rowling and film series actors Daniel Radcliffe, Rupert Grint, Emma Watson, Michael Gambon, Robbie Coltrane, Tom Felton, Matthew Lewis, James and Oliver Phelps, and Bonnie Wright, as well as Universal Orlando Resort officials and representatives from the media. The ceremony, which was produced by Universal Orlando Events Production in conjunction with Thinkwell Group, concluded with a fireworks display and a performance by the Orlando Philharmonic Orchestra, conducted by original series' composer John Williams. On June 18, the second ceremony took place, which officially opened the Wizarding World of Harry Potter to the public. NBC's Today Show and The Weather Channel broadcast segments live from the park.

Phase 2: Universal Studios Florida
The opening of the Wizarding World of Harry Potter saw attendance at Islands of Adventure rise by as much as 36% in 2010. According to Jason Garcia of the Orlando Sentinel, this had resort executives pondering "when to expand Wizarding World and how to keep business balanced between Islands and Universal Studios Florida". In April 2011, Brady MacDonald of the Los Angeles Times mentioned that rapid attendance growth led to speculation that the Wizarding World of Harry Potter would see a significant expansion, which would include Diagon Alley and a Gringotts-themed dark ride possibly replacing the Lost Continent themed area in Islands of Adventure.

On December 6, 2011, Universal Parks & Resorts confirmed expansion plans but did not reveal specific details. The announcement was made just four days after Universal revealed plans to permanently close the Jaws attraction. Following its closure the following month, the Los Angeles Times stated that the site of the former Jaws ride in Universal Studios Florida would be used for the Wizarding World of Harry Potter expansion, despite what previous speculation suggested. These rides would be complemented by a replica of the Hogwarts Express to move guests between the two parks. Demolition of the Jaws ride and the Amity area began almost immediately after their closure. After the site was leveled, work began on land reclamation in the area's former lagoon, as well as construction of a series of buildings including a large show building.

Further details about the expansion of the Wizarding World of Harry Potter were announced on May 8, 2013. Officials confirmed that the expansion would be set predominantly in the adjacent Universal Studios Florida theme park, and would feature areas themed after Diagon Alley and London. The rumored Hogwarts Express connection between the two parks was also confirmed. Officials stated the expansion should open in 2014.

On January 23, 2014, officials announced the name of the flagship roller coaster would be Harry Potter and the Escape from Gringotts. They also indicated that a two-park pass would be necessary to ride the Hogwarts Express, which was set to connect Universal Studios Florida with the existing Harry Potter area at Universal's Islands of Adventure.

The official opening date of the Diagon Alley phase was announced at an exclusive and private press conference on June 17, 2014, for July 8, 2014. On June 18, 2014, the Diagon Alley red carpet premiere took place with Domhnall Gleeson, Bonnie Wright, Evanna Lynch, Matthew Lewis, James and Oliver Phelps, Tom Felton, Robbie Coltrane, Warwick Davis and Helena Bonham Carter attending. New photos of Diagon Alley were later released the same night and the official opening date was  announced publicly by Universal Orlando's president, Bill Davis. King's Cross station opened on July 1, 2014, as well as the Hogwarts Express Hogsmeade Station at Islands of Adventure and soft openings of Diagon Alley began on July 3, 2014. Diagon Alley officially opened on July 8, 2014.

Attractions
The Wizarding World of Harry Potter has four rides. Three rides opened in 2010 as part of phase one, while two additional rides opened in phase two in 2014. Dragon Challenge, one of the rides from the first phase, was closed permanently in 2017.

Hogsmeade
 Dragon Challenge was an inverted roller coaster featuring two distinct tracks that overlapped and intertwined with each other. The coaster predated the Wizarding World of Harry Potter, having operated under the name Dueling Dragons since the park's 1999 opening. The tracks remained the same, but were renamed in homage to the first task of the Triwizard Tournament where Harry and the other contestants are each to duel with a dragon, depicted in chapter 20 of Harry Potter and the Goblet of Fire. The two sides of the coaster were renamed "Hungarian Horntail" and "Chinese Fireball", after two of the dragon breeds which appear in the book. It was the only chasing inverted roller coaster in the world. The queue for this ride featured many Harry Potter relics, including the Goblet of Fire and the Triwizard Cup. In addition, the hike to the ride featured Ron Weasley's flying Ford Anglia from in the second film, as well as Hagrid's hut. Dragon Challenge closed on September 4, 2017 to make way for Hagrid's Magical Creatures Motorbike Adventure, which opened on June 13, 2019.

Harry Potter and the Forbidden Journey is a dark ride inside the replica of Hogwarts Castle, simulating a tour of the castle and its surrounding grounds. Visitors initially walk through the castle, interacting with various characters and props from the Potter series, including a speech from Dumbledore, and directions from Harry, Hermione and Ron, before boarding a "magical bench" (controlled with a KUKA robotic arm system). Throughout the ride, guests are taken around the outside of the castle, using a combination of simulated flight as well as encountering realistic animatronic versions of the Whomping Willow, a horde of dementors, giant spiders, the Hungarian Horntail Dragon, and a Quidditch match.

Flight of the Hippogriff is a steel roller coaster designed for families, located adjacent to Harry Potter and the Forbidden Journey. The ride opened in 2000 as the Flying Unicorn. Similar to the Dragon Challenge, this ride was re-themed prior to the opening of the Wizarding World. The roller coaster's back-story is that Hogwarts's Care of Magical Creatures professor, Hagrid, is teaching young wizards to fly on a hippogriff (as Harry does in Harry Potter and the Prisoner of Azkaban) by using a wicker replica of the creature. A recreation of Hagrid's Hut is passed on the way for a lesson from Hagrid himself on how to properly approach a hippogriff.

Diagon Alley

Diagon Alley's flagship ride is Harry Potter and the Escape from Gringotts, a 3-D motion-based steel roller coaster dark ride based around Gringotts Bank, the wizarding bank in Diagon Alley. Riders enter the bank into the queue area where Blordak greets visitors and instructs them to continue past him to travel deep into the vaults of the bank to open an account. Unlike Harry Potter and the Forbidden Journey, this ride is hosted by Bill Weasley, played by Domhnall Gleeson, reprising his role from Harry Potter and the Deathly Hallows – Part 1 and Part 2.

A completely functioning full-scale replica of the Hogwarts Express was created for the Diagon Alley expansion, connecting King's Cross Station at Universal Studios to the Hogsmeade station at Islands of Adventure, manufactured by Doppelmayr Garaventa Group in the form of a funicular railway people mover. The Hogwarts Express King's Cross Station features a wall between Platforms 9 and 10, where guests can "walk through" to get to Platform , like in the first film.

Dining and shopping 

Other than the main rides, the Wizarding World of Harry Potter is also home to gift shops and restaurants. Several of these are recreations of locations in the Harry Potter books while others have been created specifically for the park. A recreation of Hogsmeade is housed at Islands of Adventure while a recreation of Diagon Alley is housed at Universal Studios Florida.

In the book series, Ollivanders wand shop is located in Diagon Alley, not Hogsmeade; however, installations of the shop are present in both areas of the Wizarding World of Harry Potter. The Hogsmeade area recreated the shop as "Ollivanders", portraying it as a branch of the original where Harry purchases his wand in Harry Potter and the Philosopher's Stone (known in the United States as Harry Potter and the Sorcerer's Stone). Unlike other shops at the Wizarding World of Harry Potter, visitors are admitted in groups of 20 to experience the premise of the Potter series, that "the wand chooses the wizard". Similar to the first film, the wand keeper and a selected guest test a variety of wands until the right one is found. Effects include flowers drying out or a thunderstorm erupting inside the shop. Shoppers can then purchase souvenir wands.

Hogsmeade 

A recreation of the Hogwarts Express lies at the entry to Hogsmeade. The recreation features "billowing steam and an iconic whistle" and is accompanied by the conductor of the train. In the Harry Potter series the Hogwarts Express is the train used to transport students from London to Hogwarts. The "Owl Post" is a working post office (where postcards and letters will be delivered with an authentic Hogsmeade postmark) that also sells stationery, writing implements, stamps, and owl-related gifts.

"The Three Broomsticks", based on the inn and pub from the Harry Potter series, offers a variety of food and beverage items from the Harry Potter universe, including Butterbeer, pumpkin juice, strawberry-peanut butter ice cream (as seen in Harry Potter and the Prisoner of Azkaban), and chocolate Cauldron Cakes, in addition to a menu composed of traditional British fare (Shepherd's pie, fish and chips, etc.). The pub features many hidden references to the book, namely house elves and ghosts that roam the rafters. Butterbeer, which can be purchased with a souvenir mug, is offered as a non-alcoholic beverage and comes in both regular and frozen forms, found at the beginning of Hogsmeade fresh off the tap from the butterbeer cart. Similarly, The Hog's Head is based on the pub from the Harry Potter series owned by Aberforth Dumbledore. Honeydukes is a sweet shop, based on Honeydukes Sweetshop in the Harry Potter series. The shop sells many items from the Harry Potter universe including Chocolate Frogs, Acid Pops, exploding bonbons, Cauldron Cakes, treacle fudge, Fizzing Whizzbees, Pepper Imps, and Bertie Bott's Every Flavour Beans.

Various Harry Potter merchandise items can be purchased from two different gift shops in Hogsmeade. Dervish and Banges is a store selling magical items, as well as Quidditch supplies, Hogwarts clothing, and other merchandise. The store is based on Dervish and Banges in the Harry Potter series.  The second shop is Filch's Emporium of Confiscated Goods. It is a general gift shop (named for Hogwarts caretaker Argus Filch) offering Hogwarts souvenirs (such as clothing and stationery), replicas of props from the Harry Potter films, and other toys and souvenirs. The shop is at the exit to Harry Potter and the Forbidden Journey, and is where guests can obtain photos of their ride experience.

Diagon Alley 

Live events at Diagon Alley include the Knight Bus interactive show at the London waterfront; "The Fountain of Fair Fortune" and "The Tale of The Three Brothers," which are puppet shows enacting stories from The Tales of Beedle the Bard; and live performances from musical group Celestina Warbeck and the Banshees (mentioned briefly by Molly Weasley in Harry Potter and the Chamber of Secrets).

Gringotts Money Exchange is able to exchange American currency for Wizarding bank notes. Diagon Alley features The Leaky Cauldron restaurant, The Hopping Pot, and Florean Fortescue's Ice Cream Parlour, which specializes in Butterbeer-flavored ice cream. The Fountain of Fair Fortune is also a bar. Ollivander's Wand Shop sells interactive wands that activate features all around Diagon Alley, Quality Quidditch Supplies, Weasleys' Wizard Wheezes joke shop, Magical Menagerie, Madam Malkin's Robes for All Occasions, Wiseacre's Wizarding Equipment. Borgin and Burkes is the only shop located in Knockturn Alley.

The table below shows a list of all the attractions including rides, shops, shows and dining areas.

Reception
The Wizarding World of Harry Potter has been well received by Harry Potter fans. Matt Blum of Wired stated "every detail is finely crafted to enhance the experience". An Orlando Sentinel article stated "muggles will love their Harry Potter adventure" but identifies the need for the park to offer Universal Express Passes due to large crowds. It also stated Harry Potter and the Forbidden Journey is a truly one-of-a-kind experience that cannot easily be described. Leigh Caldwell from Traveling Mamas noted that although the Wizarding World of Harry Potter is ideal for the whole family, it's not designed for anyone under 3 years old. She went on to consolidate others' comments about the area: "there is no doubt that fans of the Harry Potter books and movies are going to enjoy the heck out of a visit to the Wizarding World". Boris Johnson, Mayor of London, criticized the fact that the park was chosen to be in Orlando, rather than in London, stating that it was "utterly mad" to leave it to the Americans "to make money from a great British invention."

See also
 The Wizarding World of Harry Potter
 The Wizarding World of Harry Potter (Universal Studios Japan)
 The Wizarding World of Harry Potter (Universal Studios Hollywood)
 Warner Bros. Studio Tour London, studio tour exhibiting original costumes, props and sets used in all eight films, including the Great Hall, and Diagon Alley, as well as the creation process employed in the filming.

References

External links

The Wizarding World of Harry Potter at Universal Orlando Resort

Amusement rides introduced in 2010
Amusement rides introduced in 2014
Harry Potter in amusement parks
Islands of Adventure
Licensed properties at Universal Parks & Resorts
Universal Parks & Resorts attractions by name
Universal Studios Florida
2010 establishments in Florida